Hymenobacter luteus  is a Gram-negative, rod-shaped, aerobic and non-motile  bacterium from the genus of Hymenobacter which has been isolated from freshwater sediments from the Jiuxiang tourist cave in the Yunnan province in China.

References

External links
Type strain of Hymenobacter luteus at BacDive -  the Bacterial Diversity Metadatabase	

luteus
Bacteria described in 2015